The western slimy salamander (Plethodon albagula), also known as the whitethroat slimy salamander or white-throated slimy salamander, is a species of salamander. It is endemic to the United States of America and found in two disjunct populations, one from Missouri to Oklahoma, and Arkansas, and another in south-central Texas.

Description 
The western slimy salamander is typically black in color with white speckling. On some specimens, the white speckling turns into large, white blotches along the sides of their bodies. They have large, bulbous eyes and long tails.

Behavior 
Primarily nocturnal, it is commonly found under rocks, or other ground debris in moist, wooded areas. Eggs are laid in damp protected locations. The species has no aquatic larval stage. They are a shy species of salamander and are not normally found of areas where humans frequent. They live in areas of high humidity levels.

References 

Discover Life: Plethodon albagula
AmphibiaWeb: Western Slimy Salamander

Plethodon
Amphibians of the United States
Endemic fauna of the United States
Fauna of the Plains-Midwest (United States)
Amphibians described in 1944